4x4 Evo 2, also known as 4x4 Evolution 2, is a racing video game developed by Terminal Reality for the PlayStation 2, Xbox, GameCube and Microsoft Windows. It is the sequel to 4x4 Evolution and features more trucks, and more racing tracks than the original game.

The courses are primarily in extreme environments such as deserts, canyons, and other off-road locales. Players are allowed to customize their vehicle to their liking with a variety of engines, suspensions, wheels, tires, and other aftermarket parts and modifications.

Despite the PlayStation 2 version of this game being developed in North America by Terminal Reality (in the United States particularly), it was exclusively released in Europe for unknown reasons, unlike all their other titles released for the system. The Mac and GameCube versions, on the other hand, were exclusively released in North America.

Gameplay

Settings
Different settings for vehicles, time of day, and weather are available to choose from. Unlike the first 4x4 Evolution, the night and pitch black settings were removed due to a possibly unstable frame rate, which was never fixed — allegedly because it was just simply not fixable.

Missions
The player may also play through missions set in various locations, which typically revolve around locating various objects in the area. Each location has multiple missions, which revolve around a single profession or storyline. Missions between areas are not intertwined, however, and are unrelated to the racing portion of career.

Reception

The GameCube, PC, and Xbox versions of 4x4 EVO 2 received "mixed or average reviews" according to the review aggregation website Metacritic. Jeff Lundrigan of NextGen called the latter console version "A case of too many options and not enough gameplay to back it up." Steve Bauman of Computer Games Magazine gave the PC version two stars out of five, saying, "As with the original, the multiplayer is actually solid, it's really quite attractive, and there's all that… stuff… in it, but this is really more of a downgrade from a rather mediocre original game than a 'take it to the next level' sequel."

References

External links
 Developer Terminal Reality
 

2001 video games
GameCube games
Classic Mac OS games
Gathering of Developers games
Off-road racing video games
PlayStation 2 games
Video games developed in the United States
Windows games
Xbox games
Universal Interactive games
Multiplayer and single-player video games
Aspyr games
Terminal Reality games